Stanley is a 1984 Australian comedy film directed by Esben Storm and starring Peter Bensley and Graham Kennedy.

Production
Andrew Gaty had developed the original script. He had a man working for him called Steve Kibbler, who had worked with Esben Storm. Gaty asked Storm what he thought of the script and Storm did not like it. Gaty then hired him to rewrite and direct the movie, with Stanley Mann acting as script editor. Storm:
Andrew had certain things that he wanted, which I had to accommodate, but within that I was trying to make a comedy about acceptance and prejudice. But even though it was hugely unsuccessful, it was my first attempt at comedy, which I really enjoyed. Some people still come up and say they like it and have it in their collections and talk about it being hugely underrated.
The producers originally wanted to import Tom Conti to play the lead but Actors Equity objected. Peter Bensley was cast instead.

Release
The film was unsuccessful at the box office. Ebsen Storm later said:
I think the script was okay. It's very hard to do comedy, and it's either funny or it isn't. I learnt a lot about comedy on that one. I think we would've been better off if the budget hadn't been so high, if we hadn't been trying to be so glossy. Andrew was very intent on making a sort of glossy big-style movie, and in the beginning the whole thing was all predicated on getting an American or an international star to play the lead. We had Tom Conti but they wouldn't let us bring him in. That could've made the difference.
Filmink later said "To understand how the lawyers and stockbrokers raised $4 million for this comedy, it helps to remember how big a hit Arthur was in 1981, so presumably investors were hopeful of a success with this similar tale of an amiable but dimwitted rich kid."

References

External links
Stanley at IMDb
Stanley at Oz Movies

Australian comedy films
1980s English-language films
1980s Australian films